Francis Walquiria Bravo Chavarría (born 4 October 1985) is a Nicaraguan retired footballer who played as a forward. She has been a member of the Nicaragua women's national team.

Club career
Bravo has played for UNAN Managua in Nicaragua.

International career
Bravo capped for Nicaragua at senior level during the 2010 CONCACAF Women's World Cup Qualifying qualification and the 2010 Central American and Caribbean Games.

References 

1985 births
Living people
Nicaraguan women's footballers
Women's association football forwards
Nicaragua women's international footballers